The Vancouver Warriors is a professional lacrosse team based in Vancouver, British Columbia. The team plays in the National Lacrosse League (NLL). The 2022 season was the 22nd in franchise history and the 8th season in Vancouver. The franchise previously played in Everett, Washington, San Jose, and Albany, New York.

After going 6-12 for the season, and winning only one of their last 10 games, the Warriors decided to part ways with head coach Chris Gill and offensive coordinator Kaleb Toth at the end of the season.

Brett Mydske took over the role of captain this season from Matt Beers, and Mitch Jones and Tyler Codron were named Assistant Captains.

Regular season

Final standings

Game log

Roster
Source:

Entry Draft
The 2021 NLL Entry Draft took place on August 28, 2021. The Warriors made the following selections:

See also
2022 NLL season

References

Vancouver
Vancouver Warriors seasons
Vancouver Warriors